(What my God wants, may it always happen), 111, is a cantata by Johann Sebastian Bach for use in a Lutheran service. He composed the chorale cantata in Leipzig in 1725 for the third Sunday after Epiphany and first performed it on 21 January 1725, as part of his chorale cantata cycle. It is based on the hymn by Albert, Duke of Prussia, published in 1554, on the topic of the Christian's acceptance of God's will.

History and words 
When Bach composed the cantata, he was in his second year as Thomaskantor (director of church music) in Leipzig. During his first year, beginning with the first Sunday after Trinity 1723, he had written a cycle of cantatas for the occasions of the liturgical year. In his second year he composed a second annual cycle of cantatas, which was planned to consist exclusively of chorale cantatas, each based on one Lutheran hymn. It included Was mein Gott will, das g'scheh allzeit.

Bach wrote the cantata for the Third Sunday after Epiphany. The prescribed readings for the Sunday were taken from the Epistle to the Romans, rules for life, and from the Gospel of Matthew, the healing of a leper. The cantata text is based on a chorale in four stanzas, which is still popular. Three stanzas were written by Albert, Duke of Prussia, who introduced the Reformation into Prussia. An anonymous hymnwriter added the final stanza  already in the first publication in 1554. In the typical format of Bach's chorale cantatas, the first and last stanza are retained unchanged, while an unknown librettist paraphrased the inner stanzas to texts for recitatives and arias. In this case, he transcribed rather freely each stanza of the hymn to a sequence of aria and recitative. Similar to Bach's cantata for the same occasion in the first cycle, the text deals with the Christian's acceptance of God's will.

Scoring and structure 
The cantata in six movements is scored for four vocal soloists (soprano, alto, tenor, and bass), a four-part choir, two oboes, two violins, viola, and basso continuo.

 Chorus: 
 Aria (bass): 
 Recitative (alto): 
 Aria (alto, tenor): 
 Recitative (soprano): 
 Chorale:

Music 
The melody appears in an interesting combination of phrases of different length, two measures alternating with three measures. Bach used a simpler version of the melody, with all phrases of measures,  when he used the first stanza in his St Matthew Passion as movement 25. In the cantata, the lower voices prepare each entrance by imitation, sometimes repeating the line to the soprano's long final note. The vocal parts are embedded in an independent orchestral concerto of the oboes, the strings and at times even the continuo.

In movement 2, a bass aria, the librettist kept the line from the hymn "" unchanged, Bach treats it to quotation of the chorale tune for both the quotation and the free continuation "" (and the life of your soul). Movement 4 is a duet of alto and tenor, "" (Thus I walk with encouraged steps). The steps are taken together in 3/4 time, in "a minuet of a strongly assertive and confident character. But this should not surprise us; we have seen how Bach often takes suite rhythms, particularly minuet and gavotte, to represent the civilized movements of souls progressing towards heaven", as Julian Mincham describes it. Movement 5, a soprano recitative stresses the final words "O blessed, desired end!" in an arioso. It leads to the closing chorale, a "simple but powerful four-part setting" of the last stanza.

Recordings 
The recordings are taken from the listing on the Bach Cantatas Website.
 Bach Made in Germany Vol. 1 – Cantatas II, Günther Ramin, Thomanerchor, Gewandhausorchester, Agnes Giebel, Annegret Häussler, Gert Lutze, Johannes Oettel, Eterna 1953
 Bach Made in Germany Vol. 2 – Cantatas IV, Kurt Thomas, Thomanerchor, Gewandhausorchester, Elisabeth Grümmer, Marga Höffgen, Hans-Joachim Rotzsch, Theo Adam, Eterna 1960
 Bach Cantatas Vol. 1 – Advent and Christmas, Karl Richter, Münchener Bach-Chor, Münchener Bach-Orchester, Edith Mathis, Anna Reynolds, Peter Schreier, Theo Adam, Archiv Produktion 1972
 Die Bach Kantate Vol. 23, Helmuth Rilling, Gächinger Kantorei, Bach-Collegium Stuttgart, Arleen Augér, Helen Watts, Lutz-Michael Harder, Philippe Huttenlocher, Hänssler 1980
 J. S. Bach: Das Kantatenwerk – Sacred Cantatas Vol. 6, Nikolaus Harnoncourt, Tölzer Knabenchor, Concentus Musicus Wien, soloist of the Tölzer Knabenchor, Paul Esswood, Kurt Equiluz, Ruud van der Meer, Teldec 1981
 Bach Edition Vol. 5 – Cantatas Vol. 2, Pieter Jan Leusink, Holland Boys Choir, Netherlands Bach Collegium, Ruth Holton, Sytse Buwalda, Nico van der Meel, Bas Ramselaar, Brilliant Classics 1999
 J. S. Bach: Cantatas for the 3rd Sunday of Epiphany, John Eliot Gardiner, Monteverdi Choir, English Baroque Soloists, Joanne Lunn, Sara Mingardo, Julian Podger, Stephen Varcoe, Archiv Produktion 2000
 J. S. Bach: Complete Cantatas Vol. 12, Ton Koopman, Amsterdam Baroque Orchestra & Choir, Lisa Larsson, Annette Markert, Christoph Prégardien, Klaus Mertens, Antoine Marchand 2000
 J. S. Bach: Cantatas Vol. 32 – BWV 111, 123, 124, 125, Masaaki Suzuki, Bach Collegium Japan, Yukari Nonoshita, Robin Blaze, Andreas Weller, Peter Kooy, BIS 2005

References

Sources 
 
 Was mein Gott will, das gscheh allzeit BWV 111; BC A 36 / Chorale cantata (3rd Sunday of Epiphany) Bach Digital
 Was mein Gott will, das g'scheh allzeit, BWV 111 Downloadable score (pdf) with modern clefs by atticbooks, 2016
 BWV 111 Was mein Gott will, das g'scheh allzeit: English translation, University of Vermont
 Luke Dahn: BWV 111.6 bach-chorales.com

Church cantatas by Johann Sebastian Bach
1725 compositions
Chorale cantatas